Raghubir Sinh was an Indian politician . He was a Member of Parliament, representing Madhya Pradesh in the Rajya Sabha the upper house of India's Parliament as a member of the Indian National Congress.

References

Rajya Sabha members from Madhya Bharat
Indian National Congress politicians
1908 births
1991 deaths